Emmalocera strigicostella is a species of snout moth in the genus Emmalocera. It was described by George Hampson in 1896. It is found in Saudi Arabia.

References

Moths described in 1896
Emmalocera